Raymond Frederick Miller (June 7, 1898 – November 3, 1988) was a professional football player who spent two years of the National Football League with the Canton Bulldogs and the Racine Legion. Miller was a part of the Bulldogs' 1922 NFL championship team. In 1923, he played for the Legion's 4-4-2 team.

1890s births
Players of American football from Indiana
Canton Bulldogs players
Racine Legion players
Purdue Boilermakers football players
People from Fulton County, Indiana
1986 deaths